The Ballybunion Golf Club is a golf club in County Kerry, Ireland. Founded in 1893, the club had barely opened its doors before experiencing financial problems. An investment from Colonel Bartholomew saved the club in 1906, and nine new holes were promptly laid out. By 1927 the course had been expanded to 18 holes.

Considered one of the finest links courses in the world, Ballybunion's reputation grew over time. Unfortunately, its remote locale on the Irish southwest coast has prevented the course from being selected for many top championship events. Still, a number of the world's best players have found their way to the famed course. One, in particular, has had a lasting impact. Tom Watson first visited Ballybunion in 1981 and has returned often. In 1995, he remodeled Ballybunion into the course that exists today. Ballybunion was ranked by Golf Digest in 2005 as the seventh best course in the world outside the United States. Ballybunion's success has led to new visitors from around the world booking tours of this and many other golfing jewel locations. However, Ballybunion houses not one but two courses; those being The Old Course and The Cashen Course.

Ladies Tees are 5,459 yards. Par: 71 Men / 74 Ladies.
 The Cashen Course has a length of  yards (Blue Tees) and 5,997 (White Tees); Ladies Tees are 5,031 yards. Par: 72 Men & Ladies. Course Designer: Robert Trent Jones, Sr. in 1984.

The Old Course hosted the Irish Open on the European Tour in 2000, won by Patrik Sjöland.

During his second term, U.S. President Bill Clinton played the course in September 1998. A statue of him with a golf club in the town of Ballybunion commemorates the visit.  After leaving office, he returned in May 2001.

The club is located south of town on Sandhill Road.

References

External links
 

1893 establishments in Ireland
Golf clubs and courses in the Republic of Ireland
Golf in County Kerry
Sports venues in County Kerry
Irish Open (golf) venues
Sports clubs in County Kerry
Sports venues completed in 1893